The streaked kukri snake (Oligodon taeniolatus) is a species of nonvenomous snake found in Asia. It is also known as the variegated kukri or the Russell's kukri. The IUCN lists the species as least concern.

Taxonomy
The species was first described by the British physician and zoologist Thomas C. Jerdon in 1853 as Coronella taeniolata.

There are two subspecies:
 Oligodon taeniolatus taeniolatus (Jerdon 1853)
 Oligodon taeniolatus fasciatus (Günther 1864)

Distribution
India, Pakistan, Sri Lanka, S. Turkmenistan, E. Iran, Afghanistan, Bangladesh (Sub-species: fasciatus).

Literature
 Bauer, A.M. 2003 On the status of the name Oligodon taeniolatus (Jerdon, 1853) and its long-ignored senior synonym and secondary homonym, Oligodon taeniolatus (Daudin, 1803). Hamadryad 27: 205–213.
 Boulenger, George A. 1890 The Fauna of British India, Including Ceylon and Burma. Reptilia and Batrachia. Taylor & Francis, London, xviii, 541 pp.
 Dotsenko I B 1984 Morphological characters and ecological peculiarities of Oligodon taeniolatus (Serpentes, Colubridae). Vestnik Zoologii 1984 (4): 23-26
 Jerdon,T.C. 1853 Catalogue of the Reptiles inhabiting the Peninsula of India. Part 2. J. Asiat. Soc. Bengal xxii: 522-534 [1853]
 Wall, Frank 1921 Ophidia Taprobanica or the Snakes of Ceylon. Colombo Mus. (H. R. Cottle, govt. printer), Colombo. xxii, 581 pages

References

External links
 http://members.fortunecity.com/ukp001/naja/colubridae/oligodon_taeniolatus.htm 
 http://www.indiansnakes.org/content/russells-kukri

taeniolatus
Reptiles of Afghanistan
Reptiles of Pakistan
Reptiles of Central Asia
Reptiles described in 1853